Laurie Metcalf is an American actress known for her performances on stage and screen.

Filmography

Film

Television

Theatre

References

External links

Actress filmographies
American filmographies